Story of O 2 (French: Histoire d'O: Chapitre 2) is a 1984 Franco-Spanish erotic drama film directed by Eric Rochat.

The script is a continuation of the film Story of O (1975), an adaptation of the eponymous erotic novel published in 1954 by Pauline Réage.

Plot 
O, initiated by Sir Stephen to all subtleties of eroticism, takes control of her powers. A powerful industry group engages O to discredit the leader of an American competitor's financial empire, James Pembroke. Upon Pembroke's arrival in a splendid castle in France, O has the role of compromising his entire family: father, wife, son and daughter will succumb to the perverse and seductive talents of O who will meet only little resistance.

Cast 

  as "O"
 Manuel de Blas as James Pembroke
 Rosa Valenty as Rosa Pembroke
 Carole James as Carol Pembroke
 Christian Cid as Larry Pembroke
 Frank Braña
 Elmer Modling
 Eduardo Bea
 Alicia Principe
 Tomás Picó
 Rubén Bianco
 Frank Sussman
 Walter Finley
 
 
 Irene Teppa
 Catherine Basseti
 Agustin Bravo
 Malgozarta Dobosz
 Pepita Full James
 Mariano Vidal Molina

Technical 

 Title: Story of O – Chapter 2
 Autres titres : Story of O – n° 2, Return à Roissy, Histoire d'O – numéro 2
 Director: Eric Rochat, assisted by Roberto Parra 1st assistant and Manuel Pinilla 2nd assistant
 Screenplay: Eric Rochat, Jeffrey O’Kelly, after the characters of Histoire d'O de Pauline Réage
 Producer: Eric Rochat
 Executive producer: Carlos Da Silva
 Production company: Bedrock Holding
 Music: Stanley Myers, Hans Zimmer
 Photography: Andrés Berenguer
 Editing: Alfonso Santacana
 Casting: Carlos Da Silva
 Decor: Jean Claude Hoerner
 Costume design: Claude Challe
 Country: France / Spain
 Language: French
 Format: color – 1,66 35 mm
 Length: 1 h 35 min
 Genre: erotic
 Public: 18 years old in 1984, 16 years old today
 Date of first release: August 8, 1984

Sources 
 The film was adapted in comics book Histoire d'O N°2, scenario d'Eric Rochat, drawing by Guido Crepax.
 Film music Histoire d'O N°2 in composer biography Hans Zimmer
 The Encyclopedia of Film Composers. By Thomas S. Hischak. Credits: all films USA *for best song
 Livres Hebdo, Issues 336–339. Editions professionnelles du livre, 1999 – France. Avant Critiques. Page 16 Histoire d'O et sa suite Retour à Roissy
 Le Nouvel Observateur (1986), Issues 1120–1138; Volume 1120. Page 211
 La Revue du cinéma (1984), Issues 396–400. Ligue française de l'enseignement et de l'éducation permanente – Motion pictures – Page 18, 20
 The Pleasures of the Text: Violette Leduc and Reader Seduction. By Elizabeth Locey. Notes page 167. ref 19 cf "as treated in chapter 2"
 Telepro Bruxelles – Rubrique Cinéma.  Histoire d'O N°2
 Première Magazine cinéma / films / film érotique / Histoire D'O Chapitre 2
 Ecran Large – films érotique photo et critiques Histoire d'O numéro 2
 Sens Critique – films drame – Histoire d'O Chapitre 2
 Ciné cinéfil'' – films info – Histoire d'O Chapitre II
 Rotten Tomatoes – Histoire d'O Chapitre 2
 Challenges – Tout le ciné – Histoire d'O Numéro 2
 Public Ados – Ciné films – Histoire d'O Numéro 2

References

External links 
 
 Histoire d'O – numéro 2 at Allociné: http://www.allocine.fr/film/fichefilm_gen_cfilm=124595.html
 Histoire d'O numéro 2 at Unifrance: http://www.unifrance.org/film/4127/histoire-d-o-numero-2
 Music by Hans Zimmer, Stanley Myers and Mort Shuman : http://www.hans-zimmer.com/index.php?rub=disco&id=2

1984 films
Panamanian drama films
1984 drama films
1980s erotic drama films
French erotic drama films
Spanish erotic drama films
1980s French-language films
1980s English-language films
BDSM in films
Incest in film
French multilingual films
Spanish multilingual films
Films based on French novels
Films scored by Stanley Myers
Films scored by Hans Zimmer
1984 multilingual films
Films adapted into comics
1980s French films